Stacey Ryan is a Canadian singer and songwriter. She initially received public attention through TikTok in January 2022 after posting a snippet of her single, "Don't Text Me When You're Drunk", and asking users to finish the lyrics. Her subsequent single, "Fall in Love Alone", topped the Billboard Indonesia Songs chart in 2022. She is currently signed to Island Records.

Early life and education
 
Stacey Ryan was born and raised in Montreal, Quebec, Canada, in the suburban town of Vaudreuil-Dorion. Stacey Ryan was a trumpeter in École secondaire de la Cité-des-Jeunes’ wind orchestra and jazz band. She graduated high school at age 16 after which she enrolled in a 3-year college program for jazz interpretation. She studied voice and guitar while in college.

Career

In December 2021, Ryan posted a clip of her then unfinished single, "Don't Text Me When You're Drunk", and offered an "open verse challenge", asking users to finish the song with their own lyrics. Around 40,000 users created duets, contributing to hundreds of millions of views on the app. On an episode of The Tonight Show, host Jimmy Fallon sang his own verse to the song. Ryan was signed to Island Records, and, in January 2022, she released a studio version of the song with Zai1k, a musical artist and TikTok user who had collaborated with her open verse challenge.
 
In the Spring of 2022, Ryan toured with the band Lawrence. It was also announced that she would be an opener on Joshua Bassett's Fall 2022 world tour, which was later postponed to Spring 2023. In May 2022, she released the single, "Fall In Love Alone", which would eventually top the Billboard Indonesia Songs chart later in the year. In July 2022, she performed at the Montreal International Jazz Festival. The following month, she released her third single entitled "Deep End". In November 2022, Ryan embarked on a mall tour of Southeast Asia, including the Philippines and Indonesia. A remix of Ryan's single "Fall in Love Alone" featuring Indonesian artist Ziva Magnolya was released that month. She also opened for Duran Duran in 2022.

Discography

Singles

References

External links
Official website

Year of birth missing (living people)
Living people